This is a list of notable alumni of the Gonzaga University School of Law at Gonzaga University.

Federal Judges

U.S. District Judges
Franklin D. Burgess, class of 1966, Western District of Washington (1994–2005); 1961 NBA draft pick
Charnelle Marie Bjelkengren, class of 2000, Eastern District of Washington (nomination intent announced)
William James Lindberg, class of 1927, Eastern District of Washington (1951–1961), Western District of Washington (1951–1981)
Robert James McNichols, class of 1952, Eastern District of Washington (1979–1993)
Justin Lowe Quackenbush, class of 1957, Eastern District of Washington (1980–1995), Lecture Series Namesake
Thomas O. Rice, class of 1986, Eastern District of Washington (2012–present)

U.S. Bankruptcy Judges
L. Warden Hanel, class of 1939, Eastern District of Washington (1973–1981), Scholarship Namesake
John M. Klobucher, class of 1956, Eastern District of Washington (1981–1997)
Frank L. Kurtz, class of 1974, Ninth Circuit U.S. Bankruptcy Appellate Panel (2013–2019), Eastern District of Washington (2005–2019)
Madeleine C. Wanslee, class of 1988, District of Arizona (2014–present)
Patricia C. Williams, class of 1975, Eastern District of Washington (1997–2013)

State Judges

Supreme Court Justices
Edward M. Connelly, class of 1915, Washington Supreme Court (1946-1947)
Christopher Dietzen, class of 1973, Minnesota Supreme Court (2008–2016)
Mary Fairhurst, class of 1984, Washington Supreme Court (2002–2020); Washington State Bar Association President (1997–1998)
Meagan Flynn, class of 1992, Oregon Supreme Court (2017–present)
Richard P. Guy, class of 1959, Washington Supreme Court (1989–2001)
Barbara Madsen, class of 1977, Washington Supreme Court (1992–present)
Mike McGrath, class of 1975, Montana Supreme Court (2009–present),
Debra L. Stephens, class of 1993, Washington Supreme Court (2008–present)
William H. Williams, class of 1951, Washington Supreme Court (1979-1985)

From 2008–2020, with Madsen, Fairhurst, and Stephens concurrently serving on the Washington Supreme Court, Gonzaga University School of Law became the law school whose alumni constituted a majority of that Court's justices.  Each of those justices also served as chief justice in succession (Madsen then Fairhurst then Stephens).

Court of Appeals Judges
Cecily Hazelrigg-Hernandez, class of 2005, Washington Court of Appeals, Division I (2019–present)
Debra L. Stephens, class of 1993, Washington Court of Appeals, Division III (2007–2008)

District Court Judges 

 Patrick T. Johnson Jr., class of 1998, Spokane County District Court, Position 1 (2018–present)

Municipal Judges
Thomas P. Amodeo, class of 1976, Buffalo City Court (1994–present)

Politicians

Executive Branch

Governors and Lt. Governors
Christine Gregoire, class of 1977, 22nd Governor of Washington (2005–2013)

Attorneys General
Christine Gregoire, class of 1977, 16th Attorney General of Washington (1993–2005)
Catherine Cortez Masto, class of 1990, 32nd Nevada Attorney General (2007-2014)
Mike McGrath, class of 1975, 22nd Attorney General of Montana (2000-2008)

United States Attorneys
Edward M. Connelly, class of 1915, Eastern District of Washington (1942-1946)
James P. Connelly, class of 1953, Eastern District of Washington (1993-2000)
William D. Hyslop, class of 1980, Eastern District of Washington (1991-1993, reappointed 2019-present); Washington State Bar Association President (2015-2016)
James A. McDevitt, class of 1974, Eastern District of Washington (2001-2009)
Michael C. Ormsby, class of 1981, Eastern District of Washington (2010-2017)
Jeffrey C. Sullivan, class of 1971, Western District of Washington (2007-2010)

Other Executive Branch Officials
Richard A. Davey, class of 1999, Massachusetts Secretary of Transportation (2011-2014)
Jim Ferrell, class of 1993, Mayor of Federal Way, Washington (2014–present)
Dennis P. Hession, class of 1979,  42nd Mayor of Spokane, Washington (2005-2007)
Christopher Loeak, class of 1982, 6th President of the Marshall Islands (2012-2016)
Mike Pellicciotti, class of 2004, Washington State Treasurer-elect
Mary Verner, class of 1999, 43rd Mayor of Spokane, Washington (2007–2011)

Legislative Branch

United States Senate
Catherine Cortez Masto, class of 1990, U.S. Senator from Nevada (2017–present)

United States House of Representatives
Lloyd Meeds, class of 1958, U.S. Congressman from Washington (second district) (1965–1979)
George Nethercutt, class of 1971, U.S. Congressman from Washington (fifth district) (1995–2005)

State Senates
Jeff Holy, class of 1989, Senator, Washington State Senate (District 6) (2019–present); State Representative, Washington House of Representatives (District 6) (2013–2019)
Mike Padden, class of 1974, Senator, Washington State Senate (District 4) (2011–present)

State Houses of Representatives
Gary Hebl, class of 1976, State Representative, Wisconsin State Assembly (District 46) (2004–present)
Mike Pellicciotti, class of 2004, State Representative, Washington House of Representatives (District 30) (2016–present)
Jay Rodne, class of 1997, State Representative, Washington House of Representatives (District 5) (2004–2019)
Matt Shea, class of 1996, State Representative, Washington House of Representatives (District 4) (2009–present)
V. Lowry Snow, class of 1979, State Representative, Utah House of Representatives (District 74) (2012–present); Utah State Bar President (2007)

Educators
Michael Farris, class of 1976, Founder and Chancellor emeritus of Patrick Henry College, President/CEO of Alliance Defending Freedom (2017–present)
Milton G. Rowland, class of 1985, Washington State Bar Association Lifetime Service Award Recipient, Namesake for Milton G. Rowland Adjunct Professor of the Year Award

Business Leaders
Nancy Allen, class of 2015, Co-founder and Vice President of Real Estate for Stay Alfred Vacation Rentals
Kelly Cline, class of 1985, Exec. Vice President, Business and Legal Affairs, Entertainment for Fox Networks Group (FX, Fox Movie Channel, National Geographic Channel, and NG Wild)
Uri Clinton, class of 1997 Sr. Vice President and Deputy General Counsel for MGM Resorts International
Jim Parke, class of 2006, CEO for OtterBox and Blue Ocean Enterprises Inc.
Frederick Rivera, class of 1993, Exec. Vice President and General Counsel for Seattle Mariners
Bob Schroeter, class of 1990, CEO of Clallam County Economic Development Corporation (2017-2018)

Other
Daniel D. Clark, class of 2002, first President-Elect of the Washington State Bar Association with a major disability and career as a county deputy prosecuting attorney
Patrick J. Conroy, attended 1972-1973 but did not graduate, 60th Chaplain of the United States House of Representatives (2011–present)
Bing Crosby, attended 1922-1924 but did not graduate, Academy Award Winner, Grammy Hall of Fame Inductee 
Chad Little, class of 1988, NASCAR Winston West Series Champion (1987) and Director for Camping World Truck Series
Paul N. Luvera, class of 1959, American Trial Lawyers Hall of Fame Inductee
Carl Maxey (1951), civil rights leader in the Pacific Northwest
Katherine Merck, class of 2017, first Miss Rodeo America from Washington
Joe Sullivan, class of 1985, President of the National Conference of Bar Presidents (2022–23, anticipated); State Bar of Montana President (2010–11)  
Jim Wickwire, class of 1967, World-class mountain climber; First American to summit K2

References

 
Gonzaga Law alumni